Union Sportive d'Ivry  is a team handball club from Paris, France. Currently, US d'Ivry competes in the French First League of Handball.

Crest, colours, supporters

Naming history

Kit manufacturers

Kits

Sports hall information

Name: – Gymnase Auguste-Delaune
City: – Paris
Capacity: – 1500
Address: – 16 rue Robespierre, 94200 Ivry-sur-Seine, Paris, France

Accomplishments
France Handball League: 8
Champion :  1962–63, 1963–64, 1965–66, 1969–70, 1970–71, 1982–83, 1996–97, 2006–07.
Runner Up : 1981–82, 1992–93.

Coupe de France: 1
Winner : 1995–96
Runner Up : 1985–86, 1996–97, 2005–06, 2007–08, 2011–12

Limburgse Handbal Dagen: 1
Winner : 1995–96
Runner Up : 1992–93

Team 

Squad for the 2021–22 season

Goalkeepers
 12  David Bernard
 16  Mate Šunjić (c)

Wingers
RW
3  Vukašin Vorkapić
9  Lucas Petit
LW
4  Virgile Carrière
 74  Antonin Mohamed
Line players 
 21  Robin Dourte
 24  Simon Ooms

Back players
LB
2  Miloš Božović
 99  Axel Cochery
CB 
7  Léo Martinez
 14  Aymeric Zaepfel
 73  Wilson Davyes
RB
 11  Rubén Río
 25  Louis Joseph
 29  Wael Chatti

Former club members

Notable former players

  Luc Abalo (1996–2008)
  Éric Amalou (1996–1998, 2003-2006)
  Benjamin Bataille (2015–2020)
  Johan Boisedu (2019)
  François-Xavier Chapon (2001–2018)
  Fabrice Guilbert (1996–1999, 2005-2011)
  Daniel Hager (1980–1997)
  Stéphane Joulin (1988–1997)
  Denis Lathoud (1997-1998)
  Patrick Lepetit (1984–1987)
  Olivier Marroux (2008–2011)
  Olivier Maurelli (1997–1998)
  Franck Maurice (1995–1997)
  Raoul Prandi (1989-1997)
  Jean-Luc Thiébaut (1991–1994)
  Denis Tristant (1987-1988)
  Audräy Tuzolana (2002–2008)
  Walid Badi (2003–2021)
  Micke Brasseleur (2016–2018)
  Ahmed Hadjali (1997-2005, 2006-2009)
  Mohamed Mokrani (1997-2008)
  Diego Simonet (2011-2013)
  Pablo Simonet (2013-2016)
  Simon Ooms (2019-)
  Alexis Bertrand (2004–2005)
  Davor Dominiković (2011–2013)
  Irfan Smajlagić (1990-1993)
  Mirza Šarić (1996–1998, 2000-2003)
  Mate Šunjić (2018–)
  Rolando Uríos Fonseca (1998-2000)
  Radek Horák (2012)
  Ondřej Šulc (2010–2014)
  Ragnar Þór Óskarsson (2005-2007)
  Miloš Božović (2021-)
  Alexander Buchmann (2004-2005, 2007-2008)
  Wilson Davyes (2019-)
  Javier Humet (2013–2014)
  Eliodor Voica (1999-2002)
  Vassili Koudinov (1993-1997)
  Andrej Lavrov (1994-1996)
  Rok Praznik (2001–2004)
  Juan del Arco (2016–2017)
  Rubén Río (2020–2022)
  Veljko Inđić (2008–2014)
  Dejan Lukić (1997-1999)
  Nemanja Marjanović (2010-2012)
  Dragan Počuča (2004-2009)
  Ivan Stanković (2014-2017)
  Vukašin Vorkapić (2021-)
  Linus Persson (2018-2021)
  Wissem Bousnina (2010-2013)

Former coaches

External links

French handball clubs
Handball clubs established in 1977
Sport in Val-de-Marne